Titche-Goettinger (later known as Titche's)  was a department store chain based in Dallas, Texas (United States). It was established in 1902 and was a major player in the Dallas retail market until its merger with Joske's, which was later  absorbed by Dillard's.

History 
The Titche-Goettinger Department Store, formed in 1902 by Max Goettinger and Edward Titche, opened on the southeast corner of Elm and Murphy streets. Two years later, they moved to the Wilson Building. In 1928, the company began construction on a new location between Main and Elm streets at St. Paul Street to house more merchandise, including ready-to-wear apparel.

In December 1928, before the new building was complete, Titche-Goettinger was sold to Hahn Department Stores. Hahn would also purchase the San Antonio, Texas, retailer Joske's the following year. The Great Depression affected the retail market during Hahn's ownership, changing the market. The store's competitive edge was largely lost to hometown rivals Neiman Marcus and Sanger-Harris. In 1935, Hahn Department Stores changed its name to Allied Stores Corporation.

The department store expanded to the suburbs in the 1950s. Allied merged the Titche-Goettinger stores with Joske's in 1979, which was eventually purchased by Dillard's in 1987.

Flagship store 

The downtown Dallas flagship store is listed in the National Register of Historic Places and is a key contributing structure in Dallas' Harwood Historic District and Main Street District. It opened in 1929 and closed in 1987, and now houses loft-style apartments and the Universities Center at Dallas.

References

External links 
Dallas Public Library images of flagship store
The Department Store Museum: Titche-Goettinger
1900 Elm (apartment building now occupying former Titche's downtown store, includes historic store photos)

Defunct department stores based in Texas
1902 establishments in Texas
History of Dallas
Retail companies disestablished in 1979
Defunct companies based in Texas
Department stores on the National Register of Historic Places
Commercial buildings on the National Register of Historic Places in Texas
National Register of Historic Places in Dallas
1979 disestablishments in Texas
1928 mergers and acquisitions